Giulia Luzi (born 3 January 1994) is an Italian actress, singer, and dubbing voice actor. She was born in Rome, Lazio, Italy.

Luzi is best known for her recurring role in the Italian television series I Cesaroni and for playing 'Giulietta' in the Italian language premiere of Roméo et Juliette (musical) titled 'Romeo e Giulietta: Ama e Cambia Il Mondo'. She also did the dubbing for the voice of Miley Cyrus in the television series Hannah Montana on Italian television. She is also known for singing the theme song for the television series Un Medico in Famiglia.

References

External links

1994 births
Italian child actresses
Italian film actresses
Italian television actresses
Italian voice actresses
Living people
21st-century Italian singers
21st-century Italian women singers